Inc. or inc may refer to:

 Incorporation (business), as a suffix indicating a corporation
 Inc. (magazine), an American business magazine
 Inc. No World, a Los Angeles-based band
 Indian National Congress, a political party in India
 Increment, in computer programming languages, particularly assembler mnemonics
 Incumbent, the current holder of a political office

See also
INC (disambiguation)